An annular solar eclipse occurred on  February 14, 1915, also known as “The 1915 Valentine’s Day eclipse”.  A solar eclipse occurs when the Moon passes between Earth and the Sun, thereby totally or partly obscuring the image of the Sun for a viewer on Earth. An annular solar eclipse occurs when the Moon's apparent diameter is smaller than the Sun's, blocking most of the Sun's light and causing the Sun to look like an annulus (ring). An annular eclipse appears as a partial eclipse over a region of the Earth thousands of kilometres wide. Annularity was visible from Australia, Papua in Dutch East Indies (today's Indonesia), German New Guinea (now belonging to Papua New Guinea), and South Pacific Mandate in Japan (the parts now belonging to FS Micronesia and Marshall Islands, including Palikir).

Related eclipses

Solar eclipses of 1913–1917

Saros 129

Tritos series

Notes

References

1915 2 14
1915 in science
1915 2 14
February 1915 events